Maria Vicol (née Taitiș, 17 October 1935 – 13 March 2015) was a Romanian foil fencer, Olympic bronze medalist in 1960 and an Olympic team bronze medalist in 1968.

Career 

Vicol took up fencing at Progresul Bucharest, where she was trained by Angelo Pellegrini. In April 1956 she won a silver medal at the Junior World Championships in Luxembourg, bringing Romania its first fencing medal in a major competition. This was followed by a bronze medal in the individual foil at the 1960 Summer Olympics in Rome. She was part of the same generation as Olga Szabo, Ana Pascu, Ecaterina Stahl, Ileana Jenei, and Suzana Ardeleanu, with whom she won several team medals in the World Championships: bronze at the 1961 World Fencing Championships in Turin, silver at the 1965 World Fencing Championships in Paris and the  1970 World Fencing Championships in Ankara and gold at the 1969 World Fencing Championships in Havana. She also earned a team bronze medal at the 1968 Summer Olympics in Mexico.

Vicol began teaching fencing in 1968 at CS Cutezătorii. She then moved to CS Bucharest, where she discovered the future Olympic champion Laura Badea-Cârlescu. She was also an international referee.

Vicol died on 13 March 2015, aged 79. She was married to the rugby player Florin Vicol.

References

1935 births
2015 deaths
Romanian female fencers
Olympic fencers of Romania
Fencers at the 1960 Summer Olympics
Fencers at the 1964 Summer Olympics
Fencers at the 1968 Summer Olympics
Olympic bronze medalists for Romania
Olympic medalists in fencing
Sportspeople from Bucharest
Medalists at the 1960 Summer Olympics
Medalists at the 1968 Summer Olympics